Raghuvinte Swantham Raziya is a 2011 Indian Malayalam-language romantic drama film co-produced, co-written and directed by Vinayan, starring Meghana Raj, Murali Krishnan, Gautham Krishn, Lakshmi Menon, Thilakan, Spadikam George and Charuhasan. The film tells a Hindu-Muslim love story.

Plot
The film shows how terrorist outfits use money to lure unemployed youth to do their bidding. A mentally challenged young woman wanders on the city streets creating a lot of commotion. Many people, including policemen, take advantage of her. A report on her miserable plight is aired on television. Following this, Aboobacker (Sphadikam George), a rich businessman, seeks out the young woman and gets her admitted to a hospital. Aboobacker is certain that the young woman is Raziya (Meghna).

As Raziya's past unfolds, we learn that she was in love with Raghu (Murali Krishnan), her neighbour. We also come to know that his family depended on her father for survival.

Cast

 Meghana Raj as Raziya
 Murali Krishnan as Raghu
 Gautham Krishn as Riyaz
 Lakshmi Menon as Priya
 Thilakan as Kuttappan Bhagavathar
 Spadikam George as Aboobacker
 Charuhasan as Bappu Musaliar

References

External links
 Official website
 G. Jayakumar. (27 May 2011). "When presentation scuttles a fine theme". The Hindu. Retrieved 27 May 2011.
 OneIndia article
 Metromatinee article

2010s Malayalam-language films
2011 romantic drama films
2011 films
Films about terrorism in India
Films about organised crime in India
Films directed by Vinayan
Indian romantic drama films